Lisa O. Roberts is vice chancellor and chief executive of the University of Exeter. She took over from professor Steve Smith on his retirement on 1 September 2020.

Early life
In 1990, Roberts graduated with a Bachelor of Science in medical microbiology and general microbiology from the University of Birmingham.

Career
After graduation, Roberts joined Procter and Gamble as a product development manager in the UK and Belgium. In 1995, she moved to the BBSRC Institute for Animal Health (now the Pirbright Institute) and the University of Kent, where she studied for a PhD in molecular virology. In 1998, she joined the University of Surrey academic staff, where she became lecturer, senior lecturer, and professor of virology. By 2012, she was executive dean of the Faculty of Health and Medical Sciences at the University of Surrey, where she launched a new school of veterinary medicine 
In 2016, she moved to the University of Leeds. In 2019, it was announced that she would succeed Sir Steve Smith on his retirement as vice-chancellor and chief executive at the University of Exeter as of 1 September 2020.

In 2022, Professor Roberts was made Chair of the Department for Education Spiking Working Group to lead a group of academics, practitioners and student victims to improve the prevention of and responses to spiking. https://www.gov.uk/government/news/spiking-of-university-students-to-be-tackled

Publications

References

Vice-Chancellors of the University of Exeter
British virologists
Women virologists
Alumni of the University of Birmingham
Alumni of the University of Kent
Academics of the University of Leeds
Academics of the University of Surrey
Procter & Gamble people
Year of birth missing (living people)
1960s births
Living people
Missing middle or first names